was a railway station on the Japanese National Railways Temiya Line. It was located in Otaru, Hokkaidō, Japan.

History 
 6 Aug, 1912 Open as a temporary station
 1 Dec, 1914 Operation stopped
 1 Jun, 1920 Reopen
 1 May 1943 Changed to a permanent station
 1 Oct, 1943 Operation stopped
 10 Nov, 1949 Closed
 1 Sep, 1949 Open as a temporary station
 15 May 1962 Closed

Railway stations closed in 1962
Railway stations in Hokkaido Prefecture